Bathroxena is a genus of moths belonging to the family Tineidae.

There is only one species in this genus: Bathroxena heteropalpella (Dietz, 1905) from Northern America.

References

Meyrick, 1919. Exotic Microlepid. 2 : 243

External links
Images of Bathroxena heteropalpella at mothphotographersgroup.msstate.edu

Tineidae
Taxa named by Edward Meyrick
Monotypic moth genera
Moths of North America
Tineidae genera